Aldo Roy (born 22 March 1942) is a Canadian weightlifter. He competed in the men's light heavyweight event at the 1968 Summer Olympics.

References

1942 births
Living people
Canadian male weightlifters
Olympic weightlifters of Canada
Weightlifters at the 1968 Summer Olympics
Sportspeople from Greater Sudbury
20th-century Canadian people
21st-century Canadian people